The men's Greco-Roman lightweight was one of thirteen wrestling events held as part of the wrestling at the 1928 Summer Olympics programme. The competition was held from August 2 to 5, and featured 20 wrestlers from 20 nations.

Competition format

This Greco-Roman wrestling competition introduced an elimination system based on the accumulation of points. Each round featured all wrestlers pairing off and wrestling one bout (with one wrestler having a bye if there were an odd number). The loser received 3 points. The winner received 1 point if the win was by decision and 0 points if the win was by fall. At the end of each round, any wrestler with at least 5 points was eliminated.

Results

Round 1

The first round produced 5 winners by fall (0 points), 1 bye (0 points), 4 winners by decision (1 point), and 9 losers (3 points). Parisel and Metzner-Fritz withdrew after their bouts.

 Bouts

 Points

Round 2

Vávra and Westerlund were the only 2 out of the 6 men who started with 0 points to finish with 0 points, Westerlund with a bye and Vávra with a second win by fall. Five men were 2–0 with a win by decision and a win by fall for 1 point apiece. Pedersen, with a first-round bye, lost in the second round for 3 points. Also at 3 points were Błażyca and Sperling, who won by fall in round 2 after losing in round 1. Borges and Pettersson each received their first loss after winning by decision in round 1, for 4 points apiece. Five of the 7 wrestlers who had lost in round 1 lost again in round 2 and were eliminated.

 Bouts

 Points

Round 3

All 6 bouts in round 3 were won by fall, so all of the winners stayed at the same point score: Vávra and Westerlund at 0, Keresztes and Yalaz at 1, and Błażyca and Sperling at 3. Of the 6 losers, 3 had only had 1 point coming into the round and thus remained in competition with 4 points. Käpp, however, withdrew. The other 3 were eliminated. 

 Bouts

 Points

Round 4

Vávra and Westerlund, who started the round with 0 points, each lost to finish the round with 3 points and in 3rd place. Yalaz, who defeated Vávra, took over the lead at 1 point which he had gained in the first round before reeling off 3 wins by fall. Keresztes picked up a 2nd point in his defeat of Westerlund. Sperling won by fall to stay at 3 points and eliminate Błażyca; Massop did the same to stay at 4 and eliminate Janssens. 

 Bouts

 Points

Round 5

The leader lost again, this time Yalaz falling to Sperling. Keresztes took the lead with 2 points. Sperling followed with 3. Yalaz remained in competition at 4 points, as did Westerlund who picked up his 4th in a win by decision. Vávra, after leading with 0 points through round 3, had a second consecutive loss in round 5 and was eliminated. Massop also took his second loss and was eliminated.

 Bouts

 Points

Round 6

Keresztes maintained his lead, defeating Yalaz and eliminating the latter. Sperling won over Westerlund to stay in competition as well, with Westerlund eliminated. Because Westerlund and Yalaz both finished with 7 points, they would need to wrestle each other for the bronze while Sperling and Keresztes contested the gold medal.

 Bouts

 Points

Round 7

Keresztes defeated Sperling for the gold medal. Westerlund prevailed over Yalaz for the bronze.

 Bronze medal bout

 Gold medal bout

 Points

References

Wrestling at the 1928 Summer Olympics